Arnuwanda III was the penultimate king of the Hittite empire (New Kingdom) c. 1215–1210 BC (middle chronology) or c. 1209–1207 BC (short chronology).

Family
Arnuwanda was a son of Tudhaliya IV and grandson of Hattusili III and Puduhepa. He was quickly succeeded by his brother Suppiluliuma II.

See also

History of the Hittites

References

External links
Reign of Arnuwanda III

Hittite kings
13th-century BC rulers